Clinch County is a county located in the southeastern part of the U.S. state of Georgia. As of the 2020 census, the population was 6,749. The county seat is Homerville. The county was created on February 14, 1850, named in honor of Duncan Lamont Clinch.

Geography
It is the fourth-largest county in Georgia by land area and third-largest by total area. Eastern and southeastern portions of the county lie within the Okefenokee Swamp and its federally protected areas.

The vast majority of Clinch County is located in the Upper Suwannee River sub-basin of the Suwannee River basin, with just a portion of the western and northwestern edge of the county, southwest and well northwest of Du Pont, located in the Alapaha River sub-basin of the same Suwannee River basin.

Major highways

  U.S. Route 84
  U.S. Route 221
  U.S. Route 441
  State Route 31
  State Route 37
  State Route 38
  State Route 89
  State Route 94
  State Route 122
  State Route 168
  State Route 177
  State Route 187

Adjacent counties
 Atkinson County (north)
 Ware County (east)
 Columbia County, Florida (south)
 Baker County, Florida (south)
 Echols County (southwest)
 Lanier County (west)

National protected area
 Okefenokee National Wildlife Refuge (part)

Demographics

2000 census
As of the census of 2000, there were 6,878 people, 2,512 households, and 1,823 families living in the county.  The population density was 8 people per square mile (3/km2).  There were 2,837 housing units at an average density of 4 per square mile (1/km2).  The racial makeup of the county was 68.93% White or European American, 29.50% Black or African American, 0.51% Native American, 0.12% Asian, 0.10% from other races, and 0.84% from two or more races.  0.79% of the population were Hispanic or Latino of any race.

As of the census of 2010 there were 6,798 people in Clinch County.  69.7% were White or European American, 27.7% were Black or African American, 0.8% were American Indian or Alaska Native, 0.2% were Asian and 0.1% were Native Hawaiian and other Pacific Islander.

There were 2,512 households, out of which 36.50% had children under the age of 18 living with them, 51.70% were married couples living together, 16.90% had a female householder with no husband present, and 27.40% were non-families. 24.60% of all households were made up of individuals, and 9.20% had someone living alone who was 65 years of age or older.  The average household size was 2.60 and the average family size was 3.09.

In the county, the population was spread out, with 27.90% under the age of 18, 8.60% from 18 to 24, 29.00% from 25 to 44, 22.70% from 45 to 64, and 11.80% who were 65 years of age or older.  The median age was 35 years. For every 100 females there were 98.90 males.  For every 100 females age 18 and over, there were 96.50 males.

The median income for a household in the county was $26,755, and the median income for a family was $31,755. Males had a median income of $26,905 versus $19,347 for females. The per capita income for the county was $13,023.  About 22.20% of families and 23.40% of the population were below the poverty line, including 26.90% of those under age 18 and 30.90% of those age 65 or over.

2010 census
As of the 2010 United States Census, there were 6,798 people, 2,572 households, and 1,821 families living in the county. The racial makeup of the county was 67.4% white, 27.7% black or African American, 0.6% American Indian, 0.2% Asian, 0.1% Pacific islander, 2.6% from other races, and 1.4% from two or more races. Those of Hispanic or Latino origin made up 3.5% of the population. In terms of ancestry, 11.0% were English, 8.0% were Irish, and 8.0% were American.

Of the 2,572 households, 38.4% had children under the age of 18 living with them, 46.5% were married couples living together, 19.4% had a female householder with no husband present, 29.2% were non-families, and 25.7% of all households were made up of individuals. The average household size was 2.58 and the average family size was 3.10. The median age was 36.8 years.

The median income for a household in the county was $31,963 and the median income for a family was $45,350. Males had a median income of $31,739 versus $25,972 for females. The per capita income for the county was $16,709. About 19.1% of families and 25.7% of the population were below the poverty line, including 37.7% of those under age 18 and 24.3% of those age 65 or over.

2020 census

As of the 2020 United States census, there were 6,749 people, 2,477 households, and 1,639 families residing in the county.

Education

Communities
 Argyle
 Du Pont
 Fargo
 Homerville

Politics

Notable people
 Ossie Davis, actor
 Matthew Lintz, actor
 Iris Faircloth Blitch, politician, only woman to sign Southern Manifesto
 W. Benjamin Gibbs, politician
 William Chester Lankford, politician
 Jonathan Smith, football player

See also

 National Register of Historic Places listings in Clinch County, Georgia
List of counties in Georgia

References

External links
 The Clinch County News - Local newspaper
 Okefenokee National Wildlife Refuge U.S. Fish and Wildlife Service
 Clinch County historical marker
 Bethany Baptist Church historical marker

 
1850 establishments in Georgia (U.S. state)
Georgia (U.S. state) counties
Populated places established in 1850